Expenditures by federal and provincial organizations on scientific research and development accounted for about 10% of all such spending in Canada in 2006. These organizations are active in natural and social science research, engineering research, industrial research and medical research.

Below is a list of Canadian Federal and Provincial Government scientific research organizations as of January 2008. In some cases the agency mentioned is dedicated exclusively to scientific research, a good example being the National Research Council Canada. In other cases the organization conducts scientific research within the framework of a much larger mandate, such as the transportation research undertaken by the Transportation Development Centre in Montreal which occurs as part on the general transportation regulatory function of Transport Canada. While most of the organizations mentioned here are "brick and mortar", some, such as the Canadian Institutes of Health Research, are "virtual" and consist of dedicated groups of researchers who are geographically dispersed but remain in close contact through electronic means.

Total funding for the organizations listed below amounted to about C$2.5 billion in 2006, or about 10% of all scientific research and development spending in Canada.

Federal government organizations devoted exclusively to scientific research

Atomic Energy of Canada Limited - Ottawa, Ontario
 Chalk River Laboratories - Chalk River, Ontario
 Whiteshell Laboratories - Whiteshell, Manitoba
Canadian Biodiversity Information Facility (virtual research institute) [decommissioned]
Canadian Institutes of Health Research  (virtual research institutes)
 Institute of Aboriginal Peoples' Health
 Institute of Aging
 Institute of Cancer Research
 Institute of Circulatory and Respiratory Health
 Institute of Gender and Health
 Institute of Genetics,
 Institute of Health Services and Policy Research
 Institute of Human Development, Child and Youth Health
 Institute of Infection and Immunity
 Institute of Musculoskeletal Health and Arthritis
 Institute of Neurosciences, Mental Health and Addiction
 Institute of Nutrition, Metabolism and Diabetes
 Institute of Population and Public Health
Canadian Space Agency - St. Hubert, Quebec
 John H. Chapman Space Centre - St. Hubert, Quebec
 David Florida Laboratory - Ottawa, Ontario
Defence Research and Development Canada - HQ Ottawa, Ontario
 Defence R&D Canada Suffield - Suffield, Alberta
 Defence R&D Canada Toronto - Toronto, Ontario
 Defence R&D Canada Ottawa - Ottawa, Ontario
 Defence R&D Canada Centre for Security Science - Ottawa, Ontario
 Defence R&D Canada Valcartier - Valcartier, Quebec
 Defence R&D Canada Atlantic - Halifax, Nova Scotia
 Defence R&D Canada Centre for Operational Research and Analysis - Ottawa, Ontario
National Research Council of Canada - HQ Ottawa, Ontario
Scientific research
 NRC Herzberg Institute of Astrophysics (NRC-HIA) - Penticton and Victoria, British Columbia
 NRC Steacie Institute for Molecular Sciences (NRC-SIMS) - Ottawa (Sussex Drive) and Chalk River, Ontario
 NRC Canadian Neutron Beam Centre (NRC-SIMS) - Chalk River, Ontario
 NRC National Institute for Nanotechnology (NRC-NINT) - Edmonton, Alberta
 NRC Nuclear Magnetic Resonance (NRC-NMR) - Ottawa (Montreal Road Campus), Ontario
 NRC Institute for Biological Sciences (NRC-IBS) - Ottawa (Montreal Road Campus) and Ottawa (Sussex Drive), Ontario
 NRC Biotechnology Research Institute (NRC-BRI)- Montreal, Quebec
 NRC Institute for Biodiagnostics (NRC-IBD) - Winnipeg, Manitoba: Calgary, Alberta: Halifax, Nova Scotia
 NRC Plant Biotechnology Institute (NRC-PBI) - Saskatoon, Saskatchewan
 NRC Institute for Marine Biosciences (NRC-IMB) - Halifax, Nova Scotia
 NRC Genomics and Health Initiative (NRC-GHI)
 NRC Institute for Nutrisciences and Health (NRC-INH) - Charlottetown, Prince Edward Island
Engineering research
 NRC Institute for Aerospace Research (NRC-IAR)- Ottawa (Montreal Road Campus), Ottawa (Uplands Campus), Ontario: Montreal, Quebec
 NRC Centre for Surface Transportation Technology (NRC-CSTT) - Ottawa (Uplands Campus), Ontario
 NRC Canadian Hydraulics Centre (NRC-CHC)- Ottawa (Montreal Road Campus), Ontario
 NRC Institute for Ocean Technology (NRC-IOT) - St.John's, Newfoundland
 NRC Institute for Microstructural Sciences (NRC-IMS)- Ottawa (Montreal Road Campus), Ontario
 NRC Industrial Materials Institute (NRC-IMI) - Boucherville, Quebec:  London, Ontario: Saguenay (Chicoutimi), Quebec
 NRC Institute for Chemical Process and Environmental Technology (NRC-ICPET) - Ottawa (Montreal Road Campus), Ontario
 NRC Institute for Fuel Cell Innovation (NRC-IFCI) - Vancouver, British Columbia
 NRC Institute for Information Technology (NRC-IIT) - Ottawa (Montreal Road Campus), Ontario:  Gatineau, Quebec: Fredericton, Moncton, Saint John, New Brunswick
 NRC Construction Research Centre - Ottawa (Montreal Road Campus), Ontario: London, Ontario:  Regina, Saskatchewan (Centre for Sustainable Infrastructure Research)
 NRC Imaging Network (Ottawa—based)
Support institutes
 NRC Canada Institute for Scientific and Technical Information (NRC-CISTI) - Ottawa (Montreal Road Campus)
 NRC Industrial Research Assistance Program (NRC-IRAP)- Ottawa (Montreal Road Campus), Ontario and NRC-IRAP across Canada
 NRC Institute for National Measurement Standards (NRC-INMS) - Ottawa (Montreal Road Campus), Ontario

Federal government organizations conducting scientific research in support of a larger mandate

Agriculture and Agri-Food Canada - HQ, Ottawa, Ontario
Research organizations
Agassiz Research and Development Centre - Agassiz, British Columbia
 Summerland Research and Development Centre - Summerland, British Columbia
 Lacombe Research and Development Centre - Lacombe, Alberta
 Lethbridge Research and Development Centre - Lethbridge, Alberta
 Saskatoon Research and Development Centre - Saskatoon, Saskatchewan
 Swift Current Research and Development Centre - Swift Current, Saskatchewan
 Brandon Research and Development Centre - Brandon, Manitoba
 Morden Research and Development Centre - Morden, Manitoba
 London Research and Development Centre - London, Ontario
 Ottawa Research and Development Centre - Ottawa, Ontario
 Guelph Research and Development Centre - Guelph, Ontario
 Harrow Research and Development Centre - Harrow, Ontario
 Sherbrooke Research and Development Centre - Sherbrooke (Lennoxville Sector), Quebec
 Saint-Hyacinthe Research and Development Centre - Saint-Hyacinthe, Quebec
 Quebec Research and Development Centre - Quebec, Quebec
 Saint-Jean-sur-Richelieu Research and Development Centre - Saint-Jean-sur-Richelieu, Quebec
 Fredericton Research and Development Centre - Fredericton, New Brunswick
 Charlottetown Research and Development Centre - Charlottetown, Prince Edward Island
 Kentville Research and Development Centre - Kentville, Nova Scotia
 St John's Research and Development Centre - St. John's, Newfoundland and Labrador
Canadian Food Inspection Agency - Ottawa, Ontario
 National Centre For Animal Disease
 Area Laboratories Network - Atlantic
 Area Laboratories Network - Quebec
 Area Laboratories Network - Ontario
 Area Laboratories Network - Western
Canadian Grain Commission - Winnipeg, Manitoba
 Grain Research Laboratory
Canadian Polar Commission - Ottawa, Ontario
Communications Security Establishment - Ottawa, Ontario
Cryptological research for Canadian government foreign signals intelligence gathering
Canadian Forces Base Leitrim - Leitrim, Ontario
Canadian Forces Base Masset - Masset, British Columbia
Canadian Forces Base Alert - Alert, Nunavut
Environment Canada  - HQ, Gatineau, Quebec
 Canadian Ice Service
 Canadian Wildlife Service
 Meteorological Service of Canada
Fisheries and Oceans Canada  - HQ, Ottawa, Ontario
 Canadian Hydrographic Service
Research institutes
 Institute of Ocean Sciences - Sidney, British Columbia
 Pacific Biological Station
 West Vancouver Laboratory
 Cultus Lake Salmon Research Laboratory - Cultus Lake, British Columbia
 Bayfield Institute -Burlington, Ontario
 Sea Lamprey Control Centre - Sault Ste. Marie, Ontario
 Freshwater Institute Science Laboratory - Winnipeg, Manitoba
 Experimental Lakes Area - Kenora, Ontario
 Saqvaqjuac research camp - Kivalliq Region, Nunavut
 Resolute Bay Laboratories - Resolute Bay, Northwest Territories
 The Maurice Lamontagne Institute - Pointe aux Cenelles, Quebec
 St. Andrews Biological Station - St. Andrews, New Brunswick
 Bedford Institute of Oceanography - Dartmouth, Nova Scotia
 Otolith Research Laboratory
 Canadian Shark Research Laboratory
 Mactaquac Fish Culture Station - Mactaquac, New Brunswick
Industry Canada  - HQ, Ottawa, Ontario
 Communications Research Centre Canada - Ottawa, Ontario
International Development Research Centre - Ottawa, Ontario
Natural Resources Canada - HQ, Ottawa, Ontario
Canadian Forest Service
Research institutes
 Pacific Forestry Centre - Victoria, British Columbia
 Northern Forestry Centre - Edmonton, Alberta
 Great Lakes Forestry Centre - Sault Ste. Marie, Ontario
 Laurentien Forestry Centre - Quebec, Quebec
 Atlantic Forestry Centre - Fredericton, New Brunswick
 Geological Survey of Canada - Ottawa, Ontario
 Geomatics Canada - Ottawa, Ontario
 Polar Continental Shelf Project, Ottawa, Ontario
 CANMET Energy Technology Centre - Ottawa, Ontario
 CANMET Energy Technology Centre - Devon, Alberta
 CANMET Energy Technology Centre - Varennes, Quebec
 CANMET Materials Technology Laboratory - Hamilton, Ontario
Public Health Agency of Canada  - HQ, Ottawa, Ontario
 Centre for Chronic Disease Prevention and Control - Ottawa, Ontario
 Centre for Infectious Disease Prevention and Control - Ottawa, Ontario
 Laboratory for Foodborne Zoonoses - Guelph, Ontario
 National Microbiology Laboratory - Winnipeg, Manitoba
 Centre for Health Promotion - Ottawa, Ontario
Royal Canadian Mounted Police - HQ, Ottawa, Ontario
 Human Resources Assessment and Research - Ottawa, Ontario
 Forensic Science and Identification Services - Ottawa, Ontario
Statistics Canada  - Ottawa, Ontario
Transport Canada - HQ, Ottawa, Ontario
 Transportation Development Centre - Montreal, Quebec

Provincial government scientific research organizations

Alberta
 InnoTech Alberta (formerly Alberta Research Council)
 Advanced Materials Laboratories
 Analytical Chemistry Laboratory
 Fuels and Lubricants Laboratory
 Plant Genetic Engineering Laboratory
 Waste Materials Engineering Laboratory
 Papermaking Laboratory
Telecommunications Research Laboratories - Research Areas
TRLabs

British Columbia
 BCIT Technology Centre - Vancouver, British Columbia

Manitoba
 Food Development Centre
 Internet Innovation Centre

Newfoundland and Labrador
Atlantic Cool Climate Crop Research Centre
Centre for Cold-Ocean Research Engineering
Geological Survey of Newfoundland and Labrador, St. John's, Newfoundland
Northwest Atlantic Fisheries Centre

New Brunswick
Research and Productivity Council - Fredericton, New Brunswick

Nova Scotia
Research Nova Scotia - Halifax, Nova Scotia

Ontario
 Ontario Ministry of Research and Innovation - Toronto, Ontario
Research organizations
Ontario Centres of Excellence
Centre of Excellence for Communications and Information Technology
Centre of Excellence for Earth and Environmental Technologies
Centre of Excellence for Energy
Centre of Excellence for Materials and Manufacturing
Centre of Excellence for Photonics
 Ontario Institute for Cancer Research
 Regional Innovation Network Program
 Commercialization and funding organizations
 Early Researcher Awards
 The Health Technology Exchange
 Innovation Demonstration Fund
 International Strategic Opportunities Program
 Ontario Commercialization Investment Funds
 Ontario Fuel Cell Innovation Programme
 Ontario Research Commercialization Program
 Premiers Discovery Awards

Prince Edward Island
 Atlantic Technology Centre
 Food Technology Centre
 Prince Edward Island Analytical Laboratories

Quebec
 L'institut nationale de recherche scientifique (INRS) - Quebec, Quebec
 INRS Eau, Terre et Environnement
 INRS Energie, Materiaux et Telecommunications
 INRS Institut - Armand-Frappier
 INRS Urbanisation, Culture et Societe
Centre de recherche informatique de Montréal

Saskatchewan
 Saskatchewan Research Council
 3D Virtual reality Centre
 SRC Analytical Laboratories
 Biofuels Test Centre
 Bova-Can Laboratories
 Fermentation Pilot Plant
 GenServe Laboratories
 Geoanalytical Laboratories
 Petroleum Analytical Laboratories
 Pipe Flow Technology Centre
 Transformer OilTesting Laboratory
 Saskatoon Research Centre - Saskatoon, Saskatchewan

Northwest Territories
 Aurora Research Institute - Inuvik, Northwest Territories

Nunavut
 Nunavut Research Institute
 Igloolik Research Centre
 Iqaliut Research Centre

Expenditures on scientific research and development in Canada by sector

Canadian gross expenditure on R&D (GERD) by performing sectors - 2006 estimates in C$ millions:
 Business enterprises:   14,850,    52.4%
 Higher education :  10,890,    38.4%
 Federal Government 2,145,    7.6%
 Provincial Government 345,    1.2%
 Provincial research organizations 127,    0.4%
 Total:   28,357,    100.0%

See also

 Canadian university scientific research organizations
 Canadian industrial research and development organizations
 Science and technology in Canada
 Royal Society of Canada

References

 Government of Canada public website - CBC.ca, CBC News, "Federal Science tech spending continues to decline", 11 Dec 2007

Government research